Hangangno-dong is a dong, neighbourhood of Yongsan-gu in Seoul, South Korea.

Education 
 Seoul Hangang Elementary School
 Seoul Yongsan Elementary School
 Yongsan Technical High School

Transportation 
 Sinyongsan Station of 

See also 
Administrative divisions of South Korea

References

External links
 Yongsan-gu official website
 Yongsan-gu official website
 Hangangno 1-dong resident office website

Neighbourhoods of Yongsan District